Khivsky District is an administrative and municipal district (raion), one of the forty-one in the Republic of Dagestan, Russia. It is located in the southeast of the republic. Its administrative center is the rural locality (a selo) of Khiv. As of the 2010 Census, the total population of the district was 22,753, with the population of Khiv accounting for 11.7% of that number.

Administrative and municipal status
Within the framework of administrative divisions, Khivsky District is one of the forty-one in the Republic of Dagestan. The district is divided into eleven selsoviets which comprise forty-two rural localities. As a municipal division, the district is incorporated as Khivsky Municipal District. Its eleven selsoviets are incorporated as sixteen rural settlements within the municipal district. The selo of Khiv serves as the administrative center of both the administrative and municipal district.

References

Notes

Sources

Districts of Dagestan
